Hamilton Leão de Oliveira (20 May 1934 – 23 December 2015) was a Brazilian volleyball player who competed in the 1964 Summer Olympics.

References

External links
 

1934 births
2015 deaths
Brazilian men's volleyball players
Olympic volleyball players of Brazil
Volleyball players at the 1964 Summer Olympics